is a Japanese long-distance runner. She competed in the women's 5000 metres at the 2017 World Championships in Athletics.

References

External links
 

1993 births
Living people
Place of birth missing (living people)
Japanese female long-distance runners
Asian Games competitors for Japan
Athletes (track and field) at the 2018 Asian Games
World Athletics Championships athletes for Japan
Japan Championships in Athletics winners
20th-century Japanese women
21st-century Japanese women